Harveys Island is an island in the U.S. state of Georgia.

Harveys Island most likely bears the name of an early settler.

References

Islands of Georgia (U.S. state)
Landforms of Chatham County, Georgia